Atair Mimito Rocha Biai (born 12 December 1997), known as Mimito Biai, is a Bissau-Guinean professional footballer who plays as a midfielder for Romanian club FC Argeș Pitești and the Guinea-Bissau national team.

Club career
On 11 September 2016, Biai made his professional debut with Vitória Guimarães B in a 2016–17 LigaPro match against Portimonense. In June 2022, he joined Bulgarian club Cherno More. In January 2023, Biai signed a contract with Romanian team Argeș Pitești.

International career
Biai was born in Guinea Bissau and raised in Portugal. He is a former youth international for Portugal. He debuted with Guinea-Bissau in a friendly 3–0 win over Equatorial Guinea on 23 March 2022.

References

External links

Stats and profile at LPFP 

1997 births
Living people
Sportspeople from Bissau
Bissau-Guinean footballers
Guinea-Bissau international footballers
Portuguese footballers
Portugal youth international footballers
Portuguese people of Bissau-Guinean descent
Bissau-Guinean emigrants to Portugal
Naturalised citizens of Portugal
Association football midfielders
Panetolikos F.C. players
Super League Greece players
Expatriate footballers in Greece
Vitória S.C. B players
Associação Académica de Coimbra – O.A.F. players
PFC Cherno More Varna players
Expatriate footballers in Bulgaria
Liga Portugal 2 players
Liga I players
FC Argeș Pitești players
Bissau-Guinean expatriate footballers
Portuguese expatriate footballers
Portuguese expatriate sportspeople in Greece
Bissau-Guinean expatriate sportspeople in Romania